Pickworth may refer to:

Pickworth (surname)
Pickworth, Lincolnshire, England
Pickworth, Rutland, England